The School Town of Highland is the school district which serves the town of Highland in Lake County, Indiana. The district includes four elementary schools, one middle school and one high school.

References

School districts in Indiana
Education in Lake County, Indiana